Eggøybukta is a bay located on the island of  Jan Mayen. It is located west of Eggøya, on the southern side and central part of Jan Mayen.

References

Landforms of Jan Mayen
Bays of Norway